Dobromierz may refer to the following places:
Dobromierz, Kuyavian-Pomeranian Voivodeship (north-central Poland)
Dobromierz, Lower Silesian Voivodeship (south-west Poland)
Dobromierz, Świętokrzyskie Voivodeship (south-central Poland)